Marist Catholic College Penshurst (established 1953) is an independent systemic Roman Catholic co-educational secondary school located in Penshurst, a southern suburb of Sydney, Australia. The school currently caters for approximately 1000 students from Years 7 to 12. Since 2020, the school has been split among two campuses, Years 78 at South Hurstville, and Years 912 at the original site in Mortdale (commonly referred to as being in Penshurst).

History
The school first opened on 27 January 1953 as Marist College Penshurst. It was established by Father Joseph Breen, the Parish Priest of St Declan's, when Marist College Kogarah could no longer accommodate students from the Penshurst area. The school was run by Marist Brothers, Brother Leopold Smith, the first principal of the school, Brother Basil and Brother Sixtus.

Brother Thomas More Davison took over as Principal in 1960 and oversaw construction of the oval area.

In 1962, Marist College Penshurst became a Fourth Form school under the Wyndham Scheme.

Marist College Penshurst celebrated their Diamond Jubilee in 2013.

In 2015, the school was renamed Marist Catholic College Penshurst and became a 712 co-educational high school.

The 2016 Royal Commission into Institutional Responses to Child Sexual Abuse identified two infamous paedophiles, Br Kostka (John) Chute, who was Primary School Principal from 1970 to 1972 and former Science Teacher Robert (Dolly) Dunn. (From 1970 to 1988). Dunn died in gaol serving his sentence in 2009. Another school teacher, Greg Hammond was charged with Historical Child Sexual Abuse, committed during the late 1970s and early 1980s. Bill 'Jedda' Allen, a former Science Teacher was also identified as a Paedophile, however was murdered in 1988, before he could be charged.

In 2020, Brother Tony Butler remains a significant member of the college community. As the only Brother left at the school, his role involves acting as a pastoral assistant, as well as an important symbol of the College's history and values.

Former student and Primary school teacher, Paul Bateman OAM died on 9 August 2021. He was also the Artistic director of The Marist Singer's of NSW and Young Sydney Singer's. He began teaching at Penshurst Marist in 1977.

Annual events
Important annual events held by Marist Catholic College Penshurst include:
 Swimming Carnival
 Athletics Carnival
 Multicultural Food Festival
 Music/Talent concert
 Champagnat Day (held closest to his feast day on 6 June)

House system
Students participate in House competitions including the college swimming, cross country and athletics carnivals. The four houses are:
 Leopold (Red): Named after the first Headmaster of the college, Br Leo Sayer
 More (Green): Named the second Headmaster of the college, Br Thomas More
 Dunstan (Yellow): Named after the third Headmaster of the college, Br Dunstan Cavanagh
 Salvius (Blue): Originally named after the fourth Headmaster of the college, Br Simon Murphy, and later renamed after the seventh Headmaster of the college, Br Salvius

Sport
Students participate in representative sporting competitions, including:
 CBSA (Christian Brothers Sports Association) – athletics, basketball, cross country, rugby league, swimming, touch football and volleyball
 CCC (Combined Catholic Colleges) athletics, cross country and swimming
 Arthur Morris Cup (Cricket)
 Berg Shield (Cricket)
 Bill Turner Cup (Football)
 Pan Pacific Games (international)
 St George Knockout Competition (Rugby League)

Regular weekly sport is also available to students.

Change to a co-educational system and name change
In 2015, Marist College Penshurst introduced its first co-educational cohort. Its name was changed to Marist Catholic College Penshurst.

Notable alumni
 Andy WrightAustralian Oscar Winner - Sound Guru
 Mark CoureAustralian politician
 Kevin Greeneformer Australian politician
 Craig Nichollsmusician and frontman of The Vines
 Daryl Millard and Ryan Millard  brothers who are rugby league footballers.
  Matt Dufty  current rugby league player for the Canterbury-Bankstown Bulldogs

References

External links 
 School website

Boys' schools in New South Wales
Catholic secondary schools in Sydney
Association of Marist Schools of Australia
Penshurst, New South Wales
1953 establishments in Australia
Educational institutions established in 1953